Josefina Robirosa (26 May 1932 – 20 May 2022) was an Argentine artist known for her paintings, murals, and drawings. She is considered one of Argentina's most prominent women painters.

Biography 
Josefina Robirosa was born in 1932 to an aristocratic Buenos Aires family. She grew up in the Palacio Sans Souci, a grand residence in the Lomas de San Isidro suburb.

Painting was her passion from a young age. Her first solo exhibit was held in 1957 at the Galería Bonino in Buenos Aires, followed by eight more exhibitions at the same gallery over the course of several years. Later, she exhibited at the Rubbers and Ruth Benzacar galleries.

In 1957, she joined with fellow artists , Rómulo Macció, Clorindo Testa, and Osvaldo Borda to form the group Siete pintores abstractos ("Seven Abstract Painters"). She was also a member of a group of artists associated with the Torcuato di Tella Institute who revolutionized the artistic understanding of Argentina in the 1960s.

Robirosa is especially known for her public murals, including at two subway stations in the Buenos Aires Underground and the Argentine station of the Paris Métro. A retrospective exhibition of her paintings was displayed at the Museo Nacional de Bellas Arts in 1997 and at the Centro Cultural Recoleta in 2001.

For eight years, she served as director of the Fondo Nacional de las Artes, and she was an emeritus member of the Argentine .

She had two children with her first husband, the sociologist José Enrique Miguens. Her second husband was the sculptor Jorge Michel.

Robirosa died in 2022, less than a week shy of her 90th birthday.

References 

1932 births
2022 deaths
Argentine women painters
Argentine muralists
Women muralists
Artists from Buenos Aires
Argentine contemporary artists